Leptathamas is a spider genus of the jumping spider family, Salticidae, with one described species, which occurs only in New Guinea.

The genus seems to be closely related to Athamas and Bulolia, occupying a "midway" position between them.

Name
The genus name is a combination of Ancient Greek lepto "slender, fine" and the name of the related genus Athamas.

Footnotes

References
  (2003): On remarkable jumping spiders (Araneae: Salticidae) from Papua New Guinea. Folia entomologica hungarica 64: 41-58. PDF
  (2007): The world spider catalog, version 8.0. American Museum of Natural History.

Further reading
  (1980): Studies on the Papuan Attidae (Araneae): Leptathamas paradoxus gen. et sp. n. Folia ent. hung. 41: 29-31.

External links
 Diagnostic drawings of L. paradoxus
 Photograph of L. paradoxus (in vitro?)

Salticidae
Arthropods of New Guinea
Monotypic Salticidae genera
Spiders of Oceania